(born November 27, 1957) is a Japanese professional wrestler, mixed martial artist, MMA and wrestling promoter and writer, best known as the original Tiger Mask. He has wrestled under his real name as well as the names Sammy Lee, and masked Super Tiger, Tiger King, Tiger Mask and The Mask of Tiger. He is the only man to hold the WWF Junior Heavyweight Championship and the NWA World Junior Heavyweight Championship simultaneously. Sayama has the distinction of being a competitor (along with "Dynamite Kid" Thomas Billington) in the first 5 Star Rating awarded for a Match by Dave Meltzer, for their NJPW Sumo Hall Show 1983 match. This is thought of very highly in the industry. 

He is also recognized as a pioneer in mixed martial arts, founding Shooto in 1985, one of the first MMA organizations in the world. Sayama also pioneered mixed martial arts training and developed his own Shooto syllabus for learning what could be considered the first put together MMA training of its kind, with a focus on striking from arts like Boxing, Muay Thai and Karate, and grappling from Wrestling, Judo, and Sambo. The curriculum would help produce the first well rounded fighters of MMA several years before the first UFC event. He is also the founder of the martial art Seikendo and professional wrestling promotion Real Japan Pro Wrestling.

Professional wrestling career

Beginnings: New Japan Pro-Wrestling, excursion abroad (1976–1981)
Sayama debuted in New Japan Pro-Wrestling, against Shoji Kai, a jobber known to have been the debut opponent for future stars (Rusher Kimura, Masa Saito, Osamu Kido, Tatsumi Fujinami, and Mitsuo Momota had debuted against him before). Sayama weighed only 160 pounds, which, even given his training, impaired him from getting a permanent spot on NJPW cards. So they sent him abroad, to England (where he wrestled as Sammy Lee) and Mexico, where he wrestled under his real name. It was in Mexico where he started to grow not only in physical stature but also in prominence, winning the NWA World Middleweight Title in EMLL.

Return to New Japan as Tiger Mask (1981–1983)
In 1981, NJPW was looking for a way to attract young fans to its wrestling. They looked to the popular Tiger Mask anime and created a wrestling character called Tiger Mask for the fans, with the recently returned Sayama playing the role. On the evening of Thursday, April 23, 1981, Satoru Sayama made his way to the ring in the Kuramae Kokugikan as Tiger Mask. Initially, many traditional Japanese fans scoffed at the thought of artist Ikki Kajiwara's popular comic book wrestling hero being pushed as a legitimate wrestling star, but he shocked the Japanese fans in the arena by pinning Dynamite Kid with his German suplex.  As a result, he was immediately regarded as the premier star in New Japan's junior heavyweight ranks. Moreover, that match would be the first of many classic battles between the two men.

On May 6, 1982, Tiger Mask was forced to vacate the WWF Junior Heavyweight Championship after injuring his right knee. Tiger Mask would go on to win the NWA World Junior Heavyweight less than 3 weeks later on May 25, 1982. The next day, Tiger Mask defeated Black Tiger in a match for the WWF Junior Heavyweight title. This victory was met with controversy, as some board members on the NWA declared the title vacant, as they felt that the NWA World Junior Heavyweight Championship was the premier title for the division. However, during an annual meeting between the NWA and New Japan Pro-Wrestling, it was declared that Tiger Mask was still recognized as the official champion, which made him the only man to simultaneously hold the NWA World Junior Heavyweight Championship and the WWF Junior Heavyweight Championship.

Around this time, Sayama trained in sambo under Victor Koga and kickboxing under Toshio Fujiwara.

World Wrestling Federation (1982)
In late 1982, while still a member of the New Japan roster, Sayama made at least two tours of the United States. He appeared primarily in the World Wrestling Federation, at the time a regional promotion in the northeast region of the country.

Sayama defended the WWF Junior Heavyweight Championship by defeating Dynamite Kid at Madison Square Garden in New York City on August 30, and Eddie Gilbert at the Spectrum in Philadelphia on November 25. During his time as Tiger Mask, Sayama had faced mainly English and Mexican opponents, with styles complementary to his own. As a result, the match with Gilbert would be regarded as one of his higher-profile matches against an American-style opponent.

Sayama also made appearances at WWF television tapings during these tours, in which he had televised matches against José Estrada and Mr. Saito.

Joe McHugh, the Pennsylvania Athletic Commission-appointed ring announcer for WWF events in the state and nearing 80 years of age, mistakenly introduced Sayama during one of his appearances as "Timer Mask."

Departure from New Japan (1983)
During a tag team match on April 3, 1983 he was injured by Dynamite Kid; two days later, he was forced to vacate the NWA World Junior Heavyweight title after it became clear that he would need time off to recuperate. However, once the determined Tiger Mask recovered, he regained his NWA World Junior Heavyweight Championship by defeating Kuniaki Kobayashi on June 2, 1983, making him a simultaneous NWA/WWF Jr. champion for the second time. By 1983, however, Sayama started feeling dissatisfied as he hated the politics behind-the-scenes. As a result, he announced his retirement from active competition on August 12, 1983. His last match occurred on August 4, facing Isamu Teranishi. It was a shock to the wrestling world, as Tiger Mask was going to retire while he was at the top of his game and as the holder of two Junior Heavyweight Championships. Both titles were declared vacant, as he became a trainer to martial arts fighters.

Universal Wrestling Federation (1984–1985)
Sayama was inactive from the ring for nearly a year, having founded the Tiger Gym and spending most of his time training with his protege Kazuo Yamazaki.  Sayama resurfaced in the Japanese UWF in 1984. By then, All Japan Pro Wrestling had purchased the Tiger Mask name and gimmick and given it to Mitsuharu Misawa. As a result, Sayama initially made appearances for UWF as The Tiger (which was the same colors as Tiger Mask), then alternated between using his real name and the gimmick of Super Tiger (colored silver and purple). He initially supported the UWF concept and had several memorable matches against Akira Maeda and Yoshiaki Fujiwara. Sayama would soon disagree with Maeda over style ideology, which led to a shoot during a match between Sayama and Maeda in 1985, in which Maeda delivered some controversial kicks to Sayama's lower abdomen. Sayama claimed that he was kicked in the groin, resulting in Maeda being disqualified. Shortly after this, Sayama left UWF, amid recriminations from other UWF wrestlers who disliked him for his selfish leadership. With no key opponents for Maeda, the UWF collapsed and Maeda and the rest of the roster headed back to NJPW.

Retirement and Shooto (1985–1995)
Sayama then left professional wrestling altogether.

In 1986 he founded Shooto, finally realizing his dream of becoming a martial arts trainer. He taught the art of shooting to fighters like Yorinaga Nakamura, Yuki Nakai and Rumina Sato, among others. During this time Sayama hosted the Vale Tudo Japan event, leading to the introduction of Brazilian jiu-jitsu in Japan, which drove him to change the rules of Shooto to adapt them to the vale tudo. In 1996 he left Shooto due to disagreements with the board of directors, and was succeeded by Taro Wakayabayshi.

Return and aftermath (1995–present)
In 1995, Sayama was offered to return to puroresu for a match against old mentor Antonio Inoki. As there was already a Tiger Mask on the scene (his disciple, Tiger Mask IV, who debuted with the mask), Sayama used the name and gimmick Tiger King, using a gold-colored outfit. Inoki ended up winning the match.

In subsequent years, he (using the Original [Shodai] Tiger Mask identity), competing sporadically in various independent promotions, often in legends matches and teams with his younger disciple. In 1998, he was invited by Inoki to be a part of the board of his new venture, Universal Fighting-Arts Organization. He did, but left a year later to form Seikendo.

In 1999, attempting to return to the world of martial arts and to create something similar to Shooto, he created a martial art named Seikendo. It was a hybrid martial art similar to Shooto and MMA, but more akin to a traditional martial art—with focus on etiquette and ceremonials based on traditional Japanese imagery and ideals and spiritual and mental development—and focused on self-defense: Seikendokas would wear keikogis to simulate clothing, had rules that based on the principle it had a concrete floor, with groundfighting that focused on ground-and-pound, with no submissions allowed, and fighting was in an octagonal ring without ropes. Sayama also created a professional promotion by the same name to promote his martial art (as he had done to Shooto), which ran for three years and had five events before closing down in 2003.

In 2005, he founded a new promotion called Real Japan Pro Wrestling and started to promote his old Super Tiger gimmick. However, with a career spanning over 30 years in addition to being actively involved in martial arts aside from wrestling, have taken its toll, with Sayama being fodder in singles matches for current stars aiming to become legends, such as Shinjiro Otani and Triple Crown Heavyweight Champion Minoru Suzuki (the title was not on the line in their match).

He has also appeared in Tatsumi Fujinami's Dradition promotion, as well as Antonio Inoki's Inoki Genome Federation. Sayama is much heavier than he was in his younger days, and as a result, his style has changed; he focuses more on mat-based wrestling, though he still uses his trademark martial arts kicks.

Still training young wrestlers, Sayama endorsed a second Super Tiger, played by seikendoka and mixed martial artist Yuji Sakuragi. In 2010, Sayama picked Ikuhisa Minowa as the fifth Tiger Mask, but has not wrestled under the mask since.

At the March 20, 2015, Real Japan event, Sayama was defeated by All Japan wrestler Akebono following a splash from the former yokozuna. Afterwards, Sayama began experiencing chest pains, which forced him to pull out of subsequent matches. After multiple tests, it was determined that Sayama needed to undergo emergency heart surgery, which took place on May 22. Following the surgery, Sayama began suffering from angina, which forced him to pull out of Real Japan's 10th anniversary event on June 11. On June 5, Sayama held a press conference, stating that he was not thinking about retiring from professional wrestling despite his life being in danger prior to the catheter surgery. Sayama returned to the ring on June 23, 2016, battling Minowa-man to a draw, but has not been back since then.

Other media
In 1995, Sayama starred along Itsumi Osawa in the Toshihiro Sato movie Roppongi Soldier as Ken Washizu, a former kickboxer turned private detective. His partner Yoshiaki Fujiwara appears as well, portraying a fellow fighter.

He also had an appearance in the 2004 movie Shinsetsu Tiger Mask, a biographical film about Sayama's life in which he is played by Masakatsu Funaki. Sayama himself plays Tiger Mask's trainer.

Works
 (1984) 
 (1986)  
 (1989)  
 (1989)  
 (1998)   - with Victor Koga
 (1999)  
 (2000)  
 (2001)  
 (2002)  
 (2010)  
 (2014)

Championships and accomplishments
Empresa Mexicana de la Lucha Libre
NWA World Middleweight Championship (1 time)
WWF Junior Heavyweight Championship (1 time)
New Japan Pro-Wrestling
NWA World Junior Heavyweight Championship (2 times)
WWF Junior Heavyweight Championship (2 times)
International Professional Wrestling Hall of Fame
Class of 2021
Pro Wrestling Illustrated
PWI ranked him #274 of the top 500 singles wrestlers in the PWI 500 in 2006
Real Japan Pro Wrestling
Legend Championship (1 time)
Tokyo Pro Wrestling
TWA Tag Team Championship (1 time) - with Yoji Anjo
Tokyo Sports
MVP Award (1982)
Popularity Award (1981)
Technique Award (1982, 1984)
Universal Wrestling Federation
UWF Tournament winner (1984)
Kakuto Nettai Road "A" League Tournament (1985)
Wrestling Observer Newsletter awards
Best Flying Wrestler (1982, 1983)
Most Impressive Wrestler (1982)
Best Technical Wrestler (1982, 1983)
Match of the Year (1982) vs. Dynamite Kid, August 5, Tokyo, Japan
Wrestling Observer Newsletter Hall of Fame (Class of 1996)

Luchas de Apuestas record

Kickboxing record

|-
|
|Loss
|Marc Costello
|Kakutōgi Daisensō
|Tokyo, Japan
|Decision (unanimous)
|6
|2:00
|0-1
|-
| colspan=9 | Legend:

Mixed martial arts exhibition record

|-
| Draw
| align=center| 1-0-2
|  Yoshinori Nishi
| Technical Draw
| Lumax Cup - Tournament of J'95
| 
| align=center| 1
| align=center| 5:30
| Tokyo, Japan
| 
|-
|Win
|align=center|1-0-1
| Kuniaki Kobayashi
|KO (high kick)
|Shooto: Vale Tudo Perception
|
|align=center|1
|align=center|6:05
|Tokyo, Japan
|
|-
| Draw
| align=center| 0-0-1
|  Yuji Ito
| Technical Draw
| Lumax Cup - Tournament of J'94
| 
| align=center| 2
| align=center| 3:00
| Tokyo, Japan
| 
|-

Filmography

See also
 Universal Wrestling Federation (Japan)

References

External links

 Tiger Mask (Satoru Sayama) biography
 

1957 births
Japanese male professional wrestlers
Japanese male judoka
Japanese male mixed martial artists
Japanese catch wrestlers
Japanese sambo practitioners
Living people
Masked wrestlers
People from Shimonoseki
Professional wrestling executives
Professional wrestling writers
Mixed martial arts executives
Mixed martial arts trainers
Mixed martial artists utilizing judo
Mixed martial artists utilizing sambo
Mixed martial artists utilizing shoot wrestling
Mixed martial artists utilizing catch wrestling
Stampede Wrestling alumni
Japanese sportsperson-politicians
Japanese writers
20th-century professional wrestlers
21st-century professional wrestlers
NWA World Middleweight Champions
NWA World Junior Heavyweight Champions